Pavetta mollissima is a species of plant in the family Rubiaceae. It is found in Ghana and possibly Ivory Coast. It is threatened by habitat loss.

References

mollissima
Vulnerable plants
Taxonomy articles created by Polbot